Alejandro Carabias Icaza (born 9 January 1973) is a Mexican politician from the Ecologist Green Party of Mexico. From 2009 to 2012 he served as Deputy of the LXI Legislature of the Mexican Congress representing Guerrero.

References

Politicians from Guerrero
Ecologist Green Party of Mexico politicians
21st-century Mexican politicians
1973 births
Living people
People from Acapulco
Members of the Congress of Guerrero
Deputies of the LXI Legislature of Mexico
Members of the Chamber of Deputies (Mexico) for Guerrero